Bernard Reed Green (December 12, 1911 – February 1, 2002) was an American football, basketball, and baseball player, coach, and college athletics administrator.  He served as the head football coach at the University of Southern Mississippi from 1937 to 1948, compiling a record of 59–20–4. Green's winning percentage of .735 is the best of and head coach in the history of the Southern Miss Golden Eagles football program. Born in Leakesville, Mississippi, he attended the University of Southern Mississippi from 1930 until 1933 and lettered on the football, basketball, and baseball teams. He became the head coach of Southern Miss when Allison Pooley Hubert left to become the head coach at Virginia Military Institute. Green became the athletic director at Southern Miss in 1949 and held that position until 1973. He was inducted into the Mississippi Sports Hall of Fame in 1966. Green died in 2002.

Reed Green Coliseum, home of the Southern Miss Golden Eagles basketball and volleyball teams, is named for him.

Head coaching record

Football

References

External links
 

1911 births
2002 deaths
American men's basketball players
Southern Miss Golden Eagles and Lady Eagles athletic directors
Southern Miss Golden Eagles baseball coaches
Southern Miss Golden Eagles baseball players
Southern Miss Golden Eagles basketball coaches
Southern Miss Golden Eagles basketball players
Southern Miss Golden Eagles football coaches
Southern Miss Golden Eagles football players
People from Leakesville, Mississippi
Players of American football from Mississippi
Baseball players from Mississippi
Basketball coaches from Mississippi
Basketball players from Mississippi